Chandrakant  Nureti is a given name. Notable people with the name include:

Chandrakant Bakshi, Gujarati author
Murlidhar Chandrakant Bhandare (born 1928), Indian politician
Chhagan Chandrakant Bhujbal (born 1947), politician from the state of Maharashtra, India
Nitin Chandrakant Desai, Indian art director, production designer of Indian cinema, film and television producer
Chandrakant Gokhale (1921–2008), Marathi film and stage actor and singer
Chandrakant Kamat (1933–2010), Hindustani classical tabla player of the Benares Tabla Gharana
Chandrakant Kavlekar, Indian Politician from the state of Goa,
Chandrakant Keni (1934–2009), Konkani language writer and journalist from Goa,
Chandrakant Khaire (born 1952), Shiv Sena politician from Aurangabad district
Chandrakant Kulkarni, Marathi theatre and film director, script writer and actor
Chandrakant Lahariya, Indian medical doctor, writer and social innovator
Chandrakant Limaye (born 1950), Hindustani Classical Singer from India
Chandrakant Dadu Mali, Indian Weightlifter, who won bronze medal in the 2014 Commonwealth Games
Chandrakant Mandare (1913–2001), Marathi Film actor and an artist
Chandrakant Mokate, Indian politician and member of the Shiv Sena
Chandrakant Pandit (born 1961), former Indian cricketer
Chandrakant Patankar (born 1930), former Indian cricketer
Chandrakant T. Patel, (1917–1990), cotton scientist, who developed Hybrid-4 (Sankar-4) in 1970
Chandrakant Bacchu Patil, second term member of the Maharashtra Legislative Council
Chandrakant Patil (1921–1985), 7th Lok Sabha member from Hingolias Janata Party Candidate
Chandrakant Raghunath Patil, member of the 16th Lok Sabha of India
Chandrakant Raut (born 1945), Indian cricketer
Chandrakant Sakure (born 1990), Indian cricketer
Chandrakant Sardeshmukh (1955–2011), Hindustani classical sitar player of the Maihar Gharana
Chandrakant Shah, Canadian doctor, researcher and social activist
Chandrakant Sheth, Gujarati language poet, essayist, critic, translator and compiler
Chandrakant Singh (born 1974), Indian director and producer who has directed Hindi films such as Rama Rama Kya Hai Dramaaa
Chandrakant Baliram Sonawane, member of the 13th Maharashtra Legislative Assembly
Yashomati Chandrakant Thakur, member of the 13th Maharashtra Legislative Assembly
Chandrakant Topiwala, Gujarati language poet and critic from Gujarat, India

See also
Chandrakant Chiplunkar Seedi Bambawala, Indian situational comedy television series that aired on SAB TV
Chandrakanta (disambiguation)
Chandrakantham
Chandrakanti
Chandran